Benjamin Pogrund (born 1933) is a South African-born Israeli author.

Biography
Benjamin Pogrund was brought up in Cape Town. He began a career as a journalist in 1958, writing for The Rand Daily Mail in Johannesburg, where he eventually became deputy-editor.  The Rand Daily Mail was the only newspaper in South Africa at that time to report on events in black South African townships.  In the course of his work he came to know the major players in the apartheid struggle and gained the respect and confidence of leaders such as Nelson Mandela.

Pogrund was a reporter at the Sharpeville massacre on 21 March 1960.  He was author of a 1965 series on beating and torture of black inmates and maltreatment of white political prisoners based on a series of interviews with Harold Strachan. During his career reporting on apartheid in South Africa he was put on trial several times, put in prison once, had his passport revoked and was investigated as a threat to the state by security police.

The Rand Daily Mail ceased publication in 1985 and Pogrund left for London in 1986.  There he was the foreign editor at London's Today, and later chief foreign sub-editor of The Independent, London. Later he was editor of The WorldPaper in Boston, and reported from South Africa in The Sunday Times. He has authored books on Robert Sobukwe, Nelson Mandela and the South African press under apartheid.

Pogrund emigrated to Israel in 1997. He settled in Jerusalem with his wife Anne, an artist. He is the founder of Yakar's Centre for Social Concern. He was a member of the Israeli delegation to the United Nations World Conference against Racism in Durban.

Views and opinions
According to Pogrund, the term apartheid was being used falsely as a charge against Israel: "Anyone who knows what apartheid was, and who knows Israel today, is aware of that. Use of the apartheid label is at best ignorant and naïve and at worst cynical and manipulative." In 2020, however, he stated that his assessment might change if Benjamin Netanyahu went ahead with his 2020 electoral proposal to annex the West Bank , stating that if the plan were to be implemented, his evaluation would differ:'[At] least it has been a military occupation. Now we are going to put other people under our control and not give them citizenship. That is apartheid. That is an exact mirror of what apartheid was [in South Africa].'

Recognition and awards
Pogrund was the recipient of the 2005-06 Dr. Jean Mayer Global Citizenship Award.

Published works
 How can man die better: The life of Robert Sobukwe 
Shared Histories: A Palestinian-Israeli Dialogue (Left Coast Press, 30, 2005) 

Sobukwe and Apartheid (New Jersey:Rutgers Univ Press, 1991; Johannesburg: Jonathan Ball Publishers, 1991)  
Drawing Fire: Investigating the Accusations of Apartheid in Israel. Rowman & Littlefield, 2014

Articles
Why depict Israel as a chamber of horrors like no other in the world?, The Guardian, 8 February 2006 
Palestinians and Israelis must be able to meet to talk peace, Daily Star, 27 June 2006

Children's books
Nelson Mandela: Leader Against Apartheid (World Peacemakers) (Blackbirch Press, 2003)

See also
South African Jews

References

External links
Benjamin Pogrund Papers at Manuscripts and Archives, Yale University Library
Yakar's Center For Social Concern
Inside Apartheid: The Benjamin Pogrund Collection of Southern Africa Materials
 Collection of historical papers on Robert Mangaliso Sobukwe donated to The University of the Witwatersrand Library by Benjamin Pogrund
The Journalism that Midwifed the New South Africa
A new Tikva for all Israelis - Fathom Journal

1933 births
Living people
South African Jews
South African emigrants to Israel
Israeli people of South African-Jewish descent
South African journalists
Jewish South African anti-apartheid activists
Israeli activists
White South African anti-apartheid activists
Date of birth missing (living people)